The 2006 BDO Classic Canadian Open curling Grand Slam tournament was held January 5–8, 2006 at the MTS Centre in Winnipeg, Manitoba.

Jeff Stoughton and his hometown Winnipeg rink of Jon Mead, Garry Vandenberghe and Steve Gould won his third career Grand Slam event, defeating Calgary's John Morris rink in the final.

Round-robin standings
Final round-robin standings

Tie breaker
  Dave Boehmer 5-2  Brad Gushue

Playoffs

References

External links
Event site

2006 in Canadian curling
Curling competitions in Winnipeg
2006
BDO Classic